Bone Machine is the eleventh studio album by American singer and musician Tom Waits, released by Island Records on September 8, 1992. It won a Grammy Award for Best Alternative Music Album and features guest appearances by David Hidalgo, Les Claypool, Brain, and Keith Richards. The album marked Waits' return to studio albums, coming five years after his previous effort Franks Wild Years (1987).

Recorded in a room in the cellar area of Prairie Sun Recording studios, described by Waits as "just a cement floor and a hot water heater", the album is often noted for its rough, stripped-down, percussion-heavy style, as well as its dark lyrical themes revolving around death and chaos. The album covera blurry, black-and-white, close-up image of Waits apparently screaming while wearing a horned skullcap and protective goggleswas taken by filmmaker Jesse Dylan, son of Bob Dylan.

Recording and production
Bone Machine was recorded and produced entirely at the Prairie Sun Recording studios in Cotati, California, in a room of Studio C known as "the Waits Room", located in the old cement hatchery rooms of the cellar of the buildings. Prairie Sun's studio head Mark "Mooka" Rennick said, "[Waits] gravitated toward these 'echo' rooms and created the Bone Machine aural landscape. [...] What we like about Tom is that he is a musicologist. And he has a tremendous ear. His talent is a national treasure."

Waits said of the bare-bones studio, "I found a great room to work in, it's just a cement floor and a hot water heater. Okay, we'll do it here. It's got some good echo." References to the recording environment and process were made in the field-recorded interview segments made for the promotional CD release, Bone Machine: The Operator's Manual, which threaded together full studio tracks and conversation for a pre-recorded radio show format.

Bone Machine was the first Waits album on which he played drums and percussion extensively. In 1992, Waits stated: "I like to play drums when I'm angry. At home I have a metal instrument called a conundrum with a lot of things hanging off it that I've found - metal objects - and I like playing it with a hammer. I love it. Drumming is therapeutic. I wish I'd found it when I was younger."

Critical reception

Bone Machine was included on several "Best Albums of the 1990s" lists, being ranked at No. 49 by Pitchfork and No. 53 by Rolling Stone. The album was also included in the book 1001 Albums You Must Hear Before You Die.

Track listing

Personnel

Performance
 Tom Waits  lead vocals (all tracks), Chamberlin (1, 6, 9), percussion (1, 3–6, 15), guitar (1, 3, 5, 12, 14, 16), sticks (1), piano (2, 13), upright bass (7), conundrum (9), drums (10–12, 16), acoustic guitar (14)
 Brain  drums (3, 9)
 Kathleen Brennan  sticks (1)
 Ralph Carney  alto saxophone (2, 3), tenor saxophone (2, 3), bass clarinet (2)
 Les Claypool  bass guitar (1)
 Joe Gore  guitar (4, 10, 12)
 David Hidalgo  violin (13), accordion (13)
 Joe Marquez  sticks (1), banjo (11)
 David Phillips  pedal steel guitar (8, 13), steel guitar (16)
 Keith Richards  guitar (16), backing vocals (16)
 Larry Taylor  upright bass (1, 2, 4, 5, 8–12, 14, 16), guitar (7)
 Waddy Wachtel  guitar (16)

Production
 Tom Waits  producer
 Kathleen Brennan  associate producer
 Biff Dawes  recording (17, 912, 1416)
 Joe Marquez recording (8, 13)
 Tchad Blake  mixing (115)
 Biff Dawes  mixing (115)
 Joe Marquez  mixing (115), second engineer
 Joe Blaney  mixing (16)
 Shawn Michael Morris  third engineer
 Bob Ludwig  mastering
 Frances Thumm  "musical security guard"

Charts

In popular culture

 "Earth Died Screaming" is featured in the 1995 film 12 Monkeys.
 "Dirt in the Ground" is featured in the 1998 film Jerry and Tom.
 "Jesus Gonna Be Here" is featured in the 2005 film Domino, in which Waits also appears, and has been covered by gospel group The Blind Boys of Alabama.
 "Goin' Out West" is featured in the 1999 film Fight Club and has been covered by Queens of the Stone Age, Gomez, Widespread Panic, Gov't Mule, Jimmy Barnes, and Ash Grunwald.
 "I Don't Wanna Grow Up" was covered by Ramones and was featured during the end credits of the first episode of Netflix's adult animated series Big Mouth, in the 2019 film Jojo Rabbit, and during the end credits of the 2019 film Shazam! It has also been covered by Petra Haden and Bill Frisell, Hayes Carll, Scarlett Johansson, Squeeze, and Emily Kinney's character Beth Greene on The Walking Dead episode "Infected". It was also featured in an episode of "Stumptown".
 "Dirt in the Ground" has been covered by Danish band Kellermensch.
 Joan Baez's 2018 album used Whistle Down the Wind as its title, and includes a cover of Waits' song "Last Leaf".

References

Sources

 

Tom Waits albums
1992 albums
Island Records albums
Grammy Award for Best Alternative Music Album